Type 988 oceanographic surveillance ship is a type of Chinese survey vessel that is in service with both the People's Liberation Army Navy (PLAN) and Chinese civilian establishments.

Type 988 oceanographic surveillance ship is designed by the 1st Directorate of the 708th Institute of China State Shipbuilding Corporation (CSSC), which is also more commonly known as China Shipbuilding and Oceanic Engineering Design Academy (中国船舶及海洋工程设计研究)  nowadays. From December 1965 thru November 1975, a total of four ships were completed by Wuchang Shipyard, and all of them went into civilian service. The last ship built by Guangzhou Shipyard International in 1972 went into service with PLAN and had name Hai-Sheng (海声, meaning Oceanic Acoustic) 582. Type 988 is often deployed in conjunction with Type 595 ocean surveillance ship. Specification:
Length (m): 54
Beam (m): 8.5
Depth (m): 3.7
Draft (m): 2.25
Displacement (t): 590
Speed (kt): 15
Propulsion: two 301Z-301Y diesel engines @ 809 kW (1100 hp) each

References

Auxiliary research ship classes
Auxiliary ships of the People's Liberation Army Navy